The 2021 BNP Paribas Polish Cup was a professional tennis tournament played on clay courts. It was the 1st edition of the tournament which was part of the 2021 ATP Challenger Tour. It took place in Warsaw, Poland between 23 and 29 August 2021.

Singles main-draw entrants

Seeds

 1 Rankings are as of 16 August 2021.

Other entrants
The following players received wildcards into the singles main draw:
  Leo Borg
  Maks Kaśnikowski
  Szymon Kielan

The following player received entry into the singles main draw using a protected ranking:
  Jeroen Vanneste

The following players received entry from the qualifying draw:
  Daniel Michalski
  Johan Nikles
  Alexander Shevchenko
  Jan Zieliński

Champions

Singles

  Camilo Ugo Carabelli def.  Nino Serdarušić 6–4, 6–2.

Doubles

 Hans Hach Verdugo /  Miguel Ángel Reyes-Varela def.  Vladyslav Manafov /  Piotr Matuszewski 6–4, 6–4.

References

2021 ATP Challenger Tour
2021 in Polish tennis
August 2021 sports events in Poland